I Am the Dance Commander + I Command You to Dance: The Remix Album is the first remix album by American recording artist Kesha, released on March 18, 2011. Announced on February 23, 2011, the album contains nine remixes, including featured appearances from André 3000 and 3OH!3, and only one previously unreleased track, "Fuck Him He's a DJ". According to Kesha, the album's release is intended to be a play on her party girl image; her image is commonly perceived as her being drunk when in actuality her lifestyle is about enjoying life and having fun no matter the circumstances.

Background and development

I Am the Dance Commander + I Command You to Dance: The Remix Album is the first remix album by Kesha, released by RCA Records on March 18, 2011. The album's release was announced on February 23, 2011, along with the album's title, track listing, and cover. The album's track listing consists of remixed songs and new guest features from Kesha's first album, Animal, and her first extended play (EP), Cannibal. In January 2011, Kesha sent her track "Sleazy" to rapper André 3000, in hopes that he would collaborate with her; they later spoke on the phone and André agreed to appear on the track. The remix of "Animal" by DJ Switch was released online by Entertainment Weekly on February 24, 2011.

According to Kesha, the album's release is intended to be an attempt to spin her "party girl" image, which she explained, "People always think I’m a party girl and that sometimes has a negative connotation but really the party for me is not about being fucked up, [...] It’s about enjoying life and having fun no matter what the circumstances are. I consider myself not a party girl but a dance commander." The song "Fuck Him He's a DJ", is the album's only song not derived from her first studio album or extended play; the song was previously unavailable for purchase prior to the remix' release. Kesha explained the reason for its inclusion on the album stating, "I love DJs and I love that song, [...] When I do it in my live show I play guitar. It’s been a fan favorite for a long time but no one could buy it anywhere. I thought it was high time to make it available to my fans."

Composition
"The Sleazy Remix" features rapper André 3000, who raps over the song's "bouncy thump" beat talking about a young child dealing with his deadbeat father, "We start out so cute in our baby pictures/ That mama shot for our daddy so that he wouldn't forget you/ He forgot anyway, but hey, one day he'll remember/ If not, he's human, I'm human, you human, we'll forgive him." André then transitions into a rap about his relationship with Kesha before she takes over the rest of the song. Switch's remix of "Animal" features "squealing electronic flourishes" similar to his contribution to British rapper M.I.A.'s "Steppin' Up", turning the originally upbeat track into an "eerie, echoey lament".

Touring
On her first headlining tour, Get Sleazy Tour, she played the song "Fuck Him He's a DJ".  On her second headlining tour, Warrior Tour, she played a snippet of the Blow Cirkut Remix.

Critical reception
David Jeffries from AllMusic was positive in his review of I Am the Dance Commander + I Command You to Dance: The Remix Album. Jeffries wrote that although the album was made up of previously heard tracks from her first two albums, this remix album was completely different. "Your Love Is My Drug" and "Blow" were highlighted in the review being called the "anchor[s] [to] this generally frenzied collection." Jeffries concluded his review talking about "Fuck Him He's a DJ" writing the track "finds its official home here, strutting and sinning defiantly, reassuring Kesha fans that the kids are all spite."

In the United States, I Am the Dance Commander + I Command You to Dance: The Remix Album entered the Billboard 200 at position thirty-six, selling 14,000 units in its first week of release. In the same week, the album was listed at position thirteen on the Digital Albums chart and at number one on Billboards Dance/Electronic Albums chart. In Australia, on the issue date titled April 3, 2011, the album entered the charts at position forty-six..The Remix album sold 118,000 copies in US.

Track listing

Track list as per the I Am the Dance Commander + I Command You to Dance: The Remix Album audio CD liner notes.

A clean/censored version of the album is available at Walmart; it omits the track "Fuck Him He's a DJ".

Personnel
Credits adapted from the liner notes of I Am the Dance Commander + I Command You to Dance: The Remix Album, Dynamite Cop Music/Where Da Kasz at BMI.

Benny Blanco – producer
Billboard – remixing
Anita Marisa Boproducer
DJ Cirkut – remixing
DJ Skeet Skeet – additional production, remixing
Dr. Luke – executive producer, producer
Dream Machine – remix producer
Christian Dwiggins – mixing
Dave Dwiggins – mixing
Fred Falke – additional production, instrumentation
Sarai Fiszelld – make-up
Sean Foreman – composer
Chris Gehringer – mastering
Serban Ghenea – mixing
Erwin Gorostiza – creative director
Lukasz Gottwald – composer
Allan Grigg – composer
Rani Hancock – A&R
John Hanes – mixing
Jacob Kasher Hindlin – composer
Neon Hitch – composer
Claude Kelly – composer
Kool Kojak – producer
Greg Kurstin – composer, producer
Benjamin Levin – composer
Marjan Malakpour – stylist
Max Martin – composer, producer
Ramsell Martinez – hair stylist
Miriam Nervo – composer, vocal producer, background vocals
Olivia Nervo – composer, vocal producer, background vocals
Tom Neville – arranger, composer, engineer, instrumentation, producer
Tim Roberts – mixing assistant
Kesha Sebert – composer
Pebe Sebert – composer
Skinny – creative consultant
Sticky K – additional production, remixing
Switch – additional production, remixing
Untold – Additional production, remixing
Emily Wright – engineer

Charts

Weekly charts

Year-end charts

Release history

References

External links
I Am the Dance Commander + I Command You to Dance: The Remix Album at Allmusic

2011 remix albums
Albums produced by Bangladesh (record producer)
Albums produced by Benny Blanco
Albums produced by Cirkut
Albums produced by Dr. Luke
Kesha albums
RCA Records remix albums
Remix albums by American artists